Two from the Vault is a three-CD live album by the rock band the Grateful Dead. It was recorded at the Shrine Auditorium in Los Angeles, California on August 24, 1968. The event was left unreleased for nearly 25 years, before being mixed down from the original multi-track reels and released on Grateful Dead Records in 1992.

Recording

The concert was recorded on a then-state-of-the-art, one-inch 8-track tape machine that was supplied by the band's record label, Warner Bros.  The record company also insisted on supplying engineers who turned out to be unfamiliar with the close miking technique involved in recording rock music. Consequently, each of the eight tracks contained significant leakage from all of the other instruments in the band, resulting in severe phase cancellation problems.

Almost twenty-four years later, Don Pearson and producer Dan Healy solved this problem by employing a B&K 2032 Fast Fourier transform (FFT) digital spectrum analyzer to measure the delay in time between the different microphones, using the track of bassist Phil Lesh as the time centerpiece.  The delay times were fed into a TC1280 stereo digital delay, which, along with careful mixing, resulted in a nearly perfect stereo image.

Releases
An expanded edition of the album, with a third CD, was released in 2007 featuring the three songs (from August 23, 1968) previously released as bonus tracks on the 2003 reissue of Anthem of the Sun .

Two from the Vault was released by Light in the Attic Records as a four-disc vinyl LP on December 9, 2014.

Track listing

Disc one
"Good Morning, Little Schoolgirl" (Sonny Boy Williamson) – 15:59
"Dark Star" (Jerry Garcia, Phil Lesh, Ron McKernan, Bob Weir, Mickey Hart, Bill Kreutzmann, Robert Hunter) – 11:20 →
"St. Stephen" (Garcia, Lesh, Hunter) – 4:40 →
"The Eleven" (Lesh, Hunter) – 14:27 →
"Death Don't Have No Mercy" (Reverend Gary Davis) – 8:23

Disc two
"That's It for the Other One" (Grateful Dead) – 15:40 →
"Cryptical Envelopment" (Garcia)
"Quadlibet for Tenderfeet" (Grateful Dead)
"The Faster We Go, the Rounder We Get" (Weir, Kreutzmann)
"New Potato Caboose" (Lesh, Robert Petersen) – 14:16 →
"Turn On Your Lovelight" (Joseph Scott, Deadric Malone) – 17:13
"(Walk Me Out in the) Morning Dew" (Bonnie Dobson, Tim Rose) – 7:13

Disc three 
"Alligator" (McKernan, Lesh, Hunter) – 18:43 →
"Caution (Do Not Stop on Tracks)" (Grateful Dead) – 11:30 →
"Feedback" (Grateful Dead) – 4:01

Notes:

While both the back cover and booklet list disc two, track one as "That's It for the Other One", the CD erroneously lists it as simply "The Other One", credited to Weir and Kreutzmann.
"(Walk Me Out in the) Morning Dew" ends abruptly as the power in the venue was cut off due to curfew.
The bonus disc features performances from the previous night. These tracks are also included in the bonus material for the 2001 reissue of Anthem of the Sun.

Personnel

Grateful Dead
Jerry Garcia – guitar,  vocals
Phil Lesh – bass, vocals
Ron "Pigpen" McKernan – keyboards, harmonica, vocals
Bob Weir – guitar, vocals
Bill Kreutzmann – percussion
Mickey Hart – percussion

Production
Dan Healy – producer
Jeffrey Norman – engineer
Don Pearson – engineer
Joe Gastwirt – mastering
Dick Latvala – tape archivist
Timothy Harris – cover art

Charts

References

External links
Two from the Vault liner notes and technical information at frognet.net

Grateful Dead live albums
1992 live albums
Albums produced by Dan Healy (soundman)
Grateful Dead Records live albums